Immigrant investor programs are programs that allow individuals to more quickly obtain residence or citizenship of a country in return for making qualifying investments.

Broadly, the programs offer either citizenship by investment ("golden passport" or "cash-for-passports"), residence by investment ("golden visa") or a hybrid with immediate residence followed by accelerated citizenship.

Program applicants must usually fulfill multiple qualification criteria. Investment can take a variety of forms including a contribution to government funds; purchase of qualifying real estate (e.g. specific government-sanctioned projects); investment in a qualifying business (e.g. a specific industry); or creation of a set number of jobs.

A growing number of countries offer immigrant investor programs, with approximately one quarter of all countries issuing such visas as of 2015. There are few statistics on the number of people pursuing these programs in aggregate.

Citizenship by investment programs 
Citizenship by investment programs enable the applicant to rapidly obtain citizenship with no required residence period, or only a short nominal period measured in days or weeks. These are often known as "golden passports" or "cash-for-passport" programs, offering visa-free travel and possible tax advantages.

Approximately a dozen countries have citizenship by investment programs. These include five countries in the Caribbean (Antigua and Barbuda, Dominica, Grenada, Saint Kitts and Nevis and Saint Lucia), as well as Cambodia, Egypt, Jordan, Malta, Montenegro (planned to be closed), North Macedonia and Vanuatu.

Countries that have historically offered citizenship by investment include Austria, Cyprus (closed), Ireland (closed), Portugal (closed) and Moldova (closed).

Dominica 
Dominica implemented its program in 1993 to provide investors the opportunity to gain Dominican citizenship via a contribution to its Economic Diversification Fund or the purchase of an alternatively approved project along with a fee. As of 2022, Dominica requires a minimum donation of $100,000 in its Economic Diversification fund or a $200,000 minimum investment in a government approved real estate project.

Malta 
The Malta Individual Investor Programme, which Henley & Partners was contracted in 2014 by the Government of Malta to design and implement, is similarly capped at 1,800 applicants. The minimum investment for this program is $870,000 with a non-refundable contribution of $700,000.

St Kitts and Nevis 
St Kitts and Nevis was the first country to offer citizenship by investment, starting in 1984.

Turkey 
Turkey offers a relatively new program known as Turkish Citizenship by Investment (TCBI). Investors are required to purchase real estate worth at least US$400,000 and hold it for 3 years or deposit US$500,000 in a bank in Turkey for a period of 3 years. Upon investing as above and submitting citizenship application duly, a Turkish passport is granted typically within 6 months.

Residence by investment programs 
Residence by investment programs allow an applicant to obtain a permanent residency visa for a country by making an investment such as purchase of property or investment in a business. These programs are often known as "golden visas". The programs (on their own) do not allow the applicant to obtain citizenship (see "Citizenship by investment" and "Hybrid programs" below). However, the person may eventually be able to apply for citizenship using standard naturalization procedures after residing in the country for a required amount of time.

Numerous countries offer these programs including Abkhazia, Australia, Brazil, Canada, Greece, Hong Kong, Malta, Monaco, New Zealand, Portugal, Singapore, Spain, Ukraine, the United Arab Emirates, the United Kingdom and the United States.

Canada 
The country historically had a national-level Canadian Immigrant Investor Program since 1986, but it was suspended in 2014. Most of the applicants were Chinese, who preferred to settle on the Pacific coast.
However, Quebec maintains its own program also established in 1986 – the Quebec Immigrant Investor Program – since the province has the right to set its own immigration policy due to the Canada–Québec Accord relating to Immigration and Temporary Admission of Aliens. The number of applicants is subject to a cap. However, applicants with an intermediate-advanced aptitude in French are not subject to the cap. The program has been associated with the lack of housing affordability in Vancouver.

Ireland 
Introduced in 2012 and closed in 2023, the "Immigrant Investor Program" (IIP) offered non-EEA nationals residence permission based on long-term investment into enterprises, investment funds, real-estate or  non-profits Republic of Ireland.

Portugal 
Portugal introduced a golden visa during the Great Recession to help attract investment into the country's housing market. By 2016, the country had issued 2,788 golden visas of which 80% had been issued to Chinese nationals. On 16th February 2023 the Government announced that it would close the programme as soon as possible; it has published draft legislation to that effect, although this remains subject to amendment and/or legal challenge.

United Kingdom 
The UK had a program known as a Tier 1 (Investor) visa.  Applicants were required to invest £2 million or more in the UK and meet other eligibility criteria. Visa holders could reside in the UK for a maximum of 3 years and 4 months, with the ability to apply for an extension of 2 more years. The visa holder could apply to settle after 5 years or less; the greater the investment, the shorter the waiting period.

According to the Home Office, 255 visas of this type were granted in the first half of 2019.

The visa was closed to new applicants on 17 February 2022.

United States 
The United States has two main investor visa programs: the E-2 and EB-5 visas.

EB-5 Visa (green card) 
The EB-5 visa program is administered by the U.S. Citizenship and Immigration Services (USCIS). Successful applicants and their family can apply for a green card.

There is an annual cap of 10,000 applications under the EB-5 program. The program is designed to encourage foreign investment in infrastructure projects, particularly in Targeted Employment Areas (TEA) with high unemployment. Funds are channeled through businesses known as regional centers, now designated only by the U.S. Department of Homeland Security. An example of a project is a million development by the Pennsylvania Turnpike Commission.

In March 2022, the EB-5 program was overhauled with the passage of new legislation called the EB-5 Reform and Integrity Act (RIA). Positive changes were introduced by RIA to enhance the appeal of the program. RIA allows concurrent filing which permits investors to live and work in the USA wile waiting for the adjudication of their EB-5 applications.

E-2 (non-immigrant) 
The E-2 investor visa program allows foreign nationals of specific treaty countries to invest in a start up, buy a business or a franchise to reside legally in the U.S.

The initial visa term varies from three months to five years depending on the U.S. reciprocity schedule with the applicant's country of citizenship. The E-2 visa can be renewed indefinitely and it is possible for the investor to change their legal status to a green card (e.g. EB-1A, EB-2, EB-3 or EB-5). The E-2 visa investor must commit to investing a substantial amount (generally ) and create American jobs (usually 2+). Most investments under  will require the investor to work 40+ hours a week in the business at least for the first 12 to 18 months.

As per recent changes made to the US regulation, individuals holding a passport from a treaty country are required to be domiciled there for a period of three years before being eligible to apply for the E-2 investor visa. This amendment was introduced as investors who were not from the treaty countries would obtain citizenship in one of the treaty countries to become eligible for the E-2 visa program.

United Arab Emirates (Golden Visa) 
The UAE introduced the Golden Visa system in 2019. It allows qualifying individuals to live, study and work in UAE without the need of a national sponsor. The residence visa program, offers various possibility to become a resident in the UAE for certain category of professionals, such as PhD holders, scientists, outstanding professional in a specific field or industry and/or to doctors and their families. Other skilled professionals included are senior scholars, elite specialists in industry and fourth industrial revolution, specialists in health industry and education.

Golden visa holders are allowed to sponsor their family members which includes spouse, children and support staff. The visa can be renewed if the required criteria is met. Unlike some other golden visa programs which requires the visa holder to maintain a duration of stay in the country, the UAE golden visa has no restriction on the maximum duration of stay outside the UAE to maintain validity of the visa.

The UAE Golden Visa costs $136,000 for investors.

Belize 
Belize offers a investor residency program with a real estate investment of $250,000 and after 5 years an individual is eligible for Belizean citizenship which offers a CARICOM passport for travel.

Hybrid residence-citizenship programs 
Hybrid residence-citizenship programs allow applicants to first obtain residence and then, after an accelerated residence period (as short as 2 years), obtain citizenship.

This type of program is offered by a growing number of countries including Bulgaria, Mauritius and Samoa.

Controversy
The sale of passports and "golden visas" has sparked controversy in several countries. Some of the criticisms include doubts about the economic benefits, as well as security concerns.

Golden visas have been criticized by members of the European Parliament for disfavouring the concept of citizenship and in 2014 the European Parliament approved a non-binding resolution that an EU passport should not have a "price tag."

Many users of such programs are wealthy Chinese and Russian citizens seeking legal security and a better quality of life outside of their home country. Golden visas have been especially popular with Chinese nationals, over 100,000 of whom acquired them during the period from 2007 to 2016. The IMF estimated in 2015 that the vast majority of golden visas are issued to Chinese nationals. More than three-quarters of the applicants to Canada's former immigrant investor program were Chinese.

Money laundering scandals involving banks in Malta and Latvia have made citizenship schemes more contentious by drawing attention to the lack of controls on Russian funds entering EU countries.

Following the 2022 Russian invasion of Ukraine, the Biden Administration described golden passport programs as a loophole for wealthy Russians to get around sanctions.

See also
 Economic citizenship
 Immigration tariff

References

Immigration
Foreign direct investment
Residency
Acquired citizenship